Castroreale (Sicilian: Castruriali) is a village in the Metropolitan City of Messina, Sicily, southern Italy.

It has around 2,702 inhabitants but over 80 churches, with some houses dating to the 13th century.

It has a tower, last remain of a castle, built by Frederick II of Aragon in 1324. The name Castroreale comes from Latin, and means "royal fortress".

People
 Antonino Borzì
 Giuseppina Vadalà
 Pina Menichelli (1890–1984)

Sources

Municipalities of the Metropolitan City of Messina